Acianthera micrantha is a species of orchid.

micrantha